Xuncu is one of nine parishes (administrative divisions) in Ribadesella, a municipality within the province and autonomous community of Asturias, in northern Spain.

Villages
 Cueves
 La Bolera
 El Cantiellu
 La Capilla
 La Cueva
 La Estación 
 La Riega
 Xuncu
 L'Acebéu
 L'Alisal
 La Cerezalina
 El Cierru
 El Colláu
 L'Escayón
 La Güelga
 El Llagarón
 El Malez
 El Palaciu de Xuncu
 El Reboriu
 El Regüetu
 La Roza
 El Toral
 La Torre

References 

Parishes in Ribadesella